Paper (also known as Paper Mag) is a New York City-based independent magazine focusing on fashion, popular culture, nightlife, music, art, and film. Initially produced monthly, the magazine eventually became a quarterly publication, and a digital version was made available online at papermag.com. In 2020, physical production of the magazine was paused following the onset of the COVID-19 pandemic in the United States. Digital content still continues to be published via the website.

History
Paper was founded in 1984 by Kim Hastreiter and David Hershkovits, former editors at the SoHo Weekly News, with help from Lucy Sisman and Richard Weigand. Beginning as a monthly print magazine in the form of a black and white 16-page fold-out, it has since transformed into a quarterly print and digital magazine.

Past cover models include Kim Kardashian, Katy Perry, Miley Cyrus, Prince, CL, Kacey Musgraves, Jennifer Lopez, and BTS.

In 2017, Hastreiter and Hershkovits sold the company to ENTtech Media Group, an entertainment technology company founded by former Condé Nast and Advanstar executive Tom Florio, and Drew Elliott, the Chief Creative Officer of Paper. Elliot left Paper in October 2019, to become the new Global Creative Director at MAC Cosmetics.

In 2020, following the onset of the COVID-19 pandemic, print production of the magazine was suspended. The final physical issue released was the Spring 2020 edition that featured Lady Gaga on the cover. Florio told WWD he was unsure when publication would resume, or if the company would continue with it at all, saying "Part of me is open enough to allow this thing to really roll out digitally and socially in the way where most people know Paper. Most people know Paper — like the kids, the Gen Z — through this social engagement. [Layoffs are] so terrible. I've never been in a situation where you couldn't ask more from people, but because of crazy life circumstances you have to make these decisions." The magazine's digital content was unaffected and continues to be published.

In July 2022, Justin Moran succeeded Elliot as editor-in-chief—Moran previously served as Digital Director.

"Break the Internet"

In November 2014, Kim Kardashian was the cover star of the "Break the Internet" issue. Kardashian was interviewed by Paper contributor Amanda Fortini for the spread "No Filter: An Afternoon with Kim Kardashian". The photos for the issue were taken by Jean–Paul Goude. The shoot was a re-creation of Goude's "Champagne Incident", a series of photographs from his 1982 book Jungle Fever. The cover photo, as well as the rest of the spread, featured a fully nude Kardashian.

The story received over 34 million unique page-views by December 2014, more than double the number of page-views Paper normally received annually, and went on to generate more than 70 million monthly unique visitors to the website.

Books 
Hastreiter and Hershkovits co-authored two books under the company's label. The first of the pair, published by Paper Publishing Company in association with Distributed Art Publishers in 1999, was titled From AbFab to Zen: Paper's Guide to Pop Culture, and had photography from John Waters. The second, titled 20 Years of Style: The World According to Paper, was published by HarperCollins in 2004 and featured writing from Michael Musto, John Waters, Isaac Mizrahi, Pedro Almodovar, Todd Oldham, Patrick McMullan, and Anna Sui.

Notes

References

External links

 

Defunct magazines published in the United States
Fashion magazines published in the United States
Monthly magazines published in the United States
Music magazines published in the United States
Quarterly magazines published in the United States
Magazines established in 1984
Magazines published in New York City
1984 establishments in New York City
Magazines disestablished in 2020
Online magazines with defunct print editions
Online magazines published in the United States